Bo Yang (7 March 1920 – 29 April 2008), sometimes also erroneously called Bai Yang, was a Chinese historian, novelist, philosopher, poet, and politician based in Taiwan. He is also regarded as a social critic. His best-known work is The Ugly Chinaman, a controversial book that was banned in Mainland China, in it he harshly criticized Chinese culture and the national character of Chinese people. According to his own memoir, the exact date of his birthday was unknown even to himself. He later adopted 7 March, the date of his 1968 imprisonment, as his birthday.

Biography 
Boyang was born as Guō Dìngshēng in Kaifeng, Henan Province, China, with family origins in Huixian.  Boyang's father changed his son's name to Guō Lìbāng to facilitate a transfer to another school. Bo Yang later changed his name to Guo Yìdòng, also spelled Kuo I-tung.  In high school, Boyang participated in youth organisations of the Kuomintang, the then-ruling party of the Republic of China, and joined the Kuomintang itself in 1938. He graduated from the National Northeastern University, and moved to Taiwan after the Kuomintang lost the civil war in 1949.

In 1950, he was imprisoned for six months for listening to Communist Chinese radio broadcasts. He had various jobs during his life, including that of a teacher. During this time, he began to write novels. In 1960, he began using the pen name Boyang when he started to write a political commentary column in the Independent Evening News. The name was derived from a place name in the mountains of Taiwan; he adopted it because he liked the sound of it.  In 1961, he achieved acclaim with his novel The Alien Realm ( Yìyù), which told the story of a Kuomintang force which fought on in the borderlands of southwestern China long after the government had retreated to Taiwan. He became director of the Pingyuan Publishing House in 1966, and also edited the cartoon page of China Daily.

Boyang was arrested again in 1967 because of his sarcastic "unwitting" criticism of Taiwan's dictator Chiang Kai-shek and in particular a translation of a comic strip of Popeye.  In the strip, Popeye and Swee'Pea have just landed on an uninhabited island. Popeye says: "You can be crown prince," to which Swee'Pea responds, "I want to be president." In the next panel, Popeye says, "Why, you little..." In the final panel, Popeye's words are too faint to be made out. Chiang was displeased because he saw this as a parody of his arrival (with a defeated army) in Taiwan, his brutal usurpation of the Presidency (a KMT competitor favored as head of government by the Truman administration was executed) and his strategy of slowly installing his son Chiang Ching-kuo as heir apparent. Boyang translated the word "fellows" as "my fellow soldiers and countrymen," a phrase used by Chiang Kai-shek. Having detained Bo Yang, the KMT's “military interrogators told him that he could be beaten to death at any time the authorities desired” when the writer refused to swallow their trumped-up charges. “Several interrogators” including Liu Chan-hua and Kao Yi-rue “played cat and mouse with him, alternating promise of immediate release with threats” and torture. In order to make him confess, they broke his leg. Western allies of the regime were not unaware of this. Shelley Rigger says that “Peng Ming-min, Bo Yang and Lei Chen” were “high-profile White Terror cases” in the 1960s but in fact, many “ of Taiwanese and Mainlanders were swept up by the White Terror, suffering imprisonment, torture, (…) execution.” The prosecutor initially sought the death sentence but due to US pressure this was reduced to twelve years in the Green Island concentration camp. From 1969 Bo Yang was incarcerated as a political prisoner (for "being a Communist agent and attacking national leaders") on Green Island for nine years.  The original 12-year sentence was commuted to eight years after the death of Chiang Kai-shek in 1975. However, the government refused to release Bo Yang after his sentence expired, and released him only in 1977, giving in to pressure from international organizations such as Amnesty International. After his release, Bo Yang continued to campaign for human rights and democracy in Taiwan. Towards the end of his life Bo Yang stated in his memoirs that he did not have the slightest intention to insult Chiang Kai-shek with his Popeye translation. This was due to the fact that in his view objective criticism mattered whereas personal insults were irrelevant.

Works 
Lin Zi-yao notes  that during his life “Bo Yang covered  a wide range of subjects from culture, literature, politics and education to love, marriage, family planning, fashion and women.”  Much of this is not fiction, although he also published a significant body of short stories, novels, and poetry. Howard Goldblatt says  that “it is significant” that an anthology of his short stories  entitled Secrets in English was “published in Chinese under the author's true name Kuo I-tung, for 'Bo Yang'  is not essentially a writer of fiction.” Goldblatt adds, “Yet like 'Bo Yang' [the writer of essays], Kuo I-tung [the novelist and short story writer] is a social critic; his fiction is written with an eye to the recording of events and to the social inequities that gave rise to them.”

Aside from his Golden Triangle novel Yiyu, (1961), Boyang is best known for his non-fiction works on Chinese history (collated and translated into modern colloquial Chinese from historical records in the prison library on Green Island) and The Ugly Chinaman ( Chǒulòu de Zhōngguórén, 1985; English translation, with the subtitle ... and the Crisis of Chinese Culture,  1992). In the introduction to excerpts from The Ugly Chinaman, the editors of an anthology entitled Sources of Chinese Tradition from 1600  through the Twentieth Century state that “(t)he sharply negative tone of the (…) essay reflects a sense of (…) despair (…) as well as a feeling that age-old  weaknesses have persisted through revolutionary change.” Also referring to The Ugly Chinaman, Rana Mitter says that Bo Yang's position as a critical observer and analyst of the world is similar to Lu Xun's. Both were skeptical, yet committed writers and less naive than younger 'romanticists'.   Edward M. Gunn agrees, saying that “(t)he fact that Bo Yang is a prolific author of satirical essays (zawen) inevitably recalls the work of Lu Xun.” Gunn also emphasizes Bo Yang's “particular interest in history” and the “acerbic wit in defense of democracy and social welfare” (or social rights of the common people).
Bo Yang gained attention internationally when  a volume of poetry entitled Poems of a Period was published in Hong Kong in 1986. These poems recall his arrest and imprisonment.

Later years
Bo Yang lived in Taipei in his later years. He became the founding president of the Taiwan chapter of Amnesty International. In 1994, Boyang underwent heart surgery, and his health never fully recovered. He carried the honorary title of national policy advisor to the administration of President Chen Shui-bian. In 2006, Boyang retired from writing, and donated the bulk of his manuscripts to the Chinese Modern Literature Museum in Beijing. He was awarded an honorary doctorate by the National Tainan University, to which he also donated many memorabilia and some manuscripts.

Boyang died of pneumonia in a hospital near his Xindian residence on 29 April 2008.  He was married five times, and is survived by his last wife, Chang Hsiang-hua, and five children born by his former wives. On 17 May 2008, his ashes were scattered along the seashore of Green Island, where he was once imprisoned.

Literature (A selection)

Essays and historical research by Bo Yang

Prose fiction and poetry by Bo Yang
   – Fiction.
   
   – Fiction.
   
  
   – Fiction.

on Bo Yang

See also
 Bo Yang Museum

Notes

References

External links

Biosketch at the Taiwanese American Foundation website
Bo Yang. "The Ugly Chinaman" The China Story Yearbook. 22 October 2013.
Hsieh Wen-hua. "Bo Yang classic reaches out to today’s youth." Taipei Times. 5 April 2008. p. 3.

1920 births
2008 deaths
20th-century Chinese historians
20th-century Chinese male writers
20th-century Chinese novelists
20th-century Chinese poets
20th-century Chinese politicians
20th-century Taiwanese poets
20th-century Taiwanese politicians
Amnesty International people
Chinese emigrants to Taiwan
Chinese male novelists
Deaths from pneumonia in Taiwan
Historians from Henan
International Writing Program alumni
Northeastern University (China) alumni
Poets from Henan
Politicians from Kaifeng
Republic of China historians
Republic of China novelists
Republic of China poets
Senior Advisors to President Chen Shui-bian
20th-century Taiwanese historians
Taiwanese people from Henan
Taiwanese philosophers
Writers from Kaifeng